Whinhill railway station is a railway station located in the east of the town of Greenock, Inverclyde, Scotland.

Opened in 1990, it is one of the newer stations on the line constructed by British Rail. Its opening made the line available to users in the south-east of Greenock for the first time in almost thirty years, since the closure of Upper Greenock station.

Services

References

External links 
Whinhill Station on YouTube

Railway stations in Greenock
Railway stations opened by British Rail
Railway stations in Great Britain opened in 1990
Railway stations served by ScotRail
SPT railway stations
1990 establishments in Scotland